The 2015 Antrim Senior Hurling Championship was the 115th staging of the Antrim Senior Hurling Championship since its establishment by the Antrim County Board in 1901. The championship began on 29 August 2015 and ended on 27 September 2015.

The championship was won by Ruairí Óg, Cushendall who secured the title following a 2-16 to 1-15 defeat of McQuillan Ballycastle in the final. This was their 13th championship title and their second in succession.

Results

Quarter-finals

Semi-finals

Final

External links
 Antrim GAA website

References

Antrim Senior Hurling Championship
Antrim Senior Hurling Championship